Chandratne Patuwathavithane (died September 14, 1989) is a Sri Lankan born academic who served as the vice chancellor of University of Moratuwa, Sri Lanka during 1980–1983 and 1988–1889 until he was assassinated in his office during 1987–89 insurgency in Sri Lanka.

Education
He was a product of Ananda College, Colombo and later gained admission to the University of Ceylon from where he graduated with a degree in engineering. He received a scholarship to study at King's College London, from which he received a PhD in mechanical engineering. Arthur C. Clark's essay collection Greetings, Carbon-Based Bipeds! (1999) is in part dedicated to his memory with the note that he "was killed while serving his students."

References

Vice-Chancellors by university in Sri Lanka
1989 deaths
Year of birth missing